The 2017 Premier Futsal was the second edition of Premier Futsal, which debuted in July 2016. Semi-finals were played in bilateral format where Mumbai Warriors beat Telugu Tigers and Delhi Dragons beat Bengaluru Royals. Mumbai Warriors won against Delhi Dragons 3–2 and won its second consecutive title.

Teams

References

2017
2017 in Indian sport